Josiah Magama Tongogara (4 February 1938 – 26 December 1979) was a commander of the ZANLA guerrilla army in Rhodesia. He was the brother of current Zimbabwe President Emmerson Mnangagwa's second wife, Jayne. He attended the Lancaster House conference that led to Zimbabwe's independence and the end of white minority rule.

Early life
Tongogara and his parents lived on the farm owned by the parents of Ian Smith, Rhodesia's last prime minister. It was where Tongogara first met Ian Smith.

In politics
Tongogara was one of several rebel commanders operating from outside of Rhodesia's borders to free the country from white rule. In 1973 he took over command from Herbert Chitepo of the armed forces of the Zimbabwe African National Union. And in 1975, he put down an internal revolt by members of the Manyika tribe and consolidated that control with the assistance of Mujuru, aka Rex Nhongo. Herbert Chitepo, who may have encouraged the Manyika revolt, was killed by a car bomb that year, and a Special International Commission in Zambia found Tongogara, among others, responsible.

At the Lancaster House Agreement in 1979, Tongogara was a crucial "moderating" force, according to Lord Carrington, the then British Foreign Secretary, who chaired the talks. By then Tongogara openly favoured unity between ZANU and Joshua Nkomo's ZAPU.  "Robert Mugabe referred to unity with Zapu as sharing the spoils with those who had not shouldered the burden of fighting," says Wilfred Mhanda, a former ZANLA commander who was imprisoned in Mozambique for allegedly leading an internal revolt within the party. As Lancaster House concluded, Tongogara returned to Mozambique, where Zanla was based, to inform his soldiers of the ceasefire. Among them was Margaret Dongo, who, aged fifteen, had crossed into Mozambique to join the guerrillas, adopting the chimurenga (liberation war) name of Tichaona Muhondo ("we shall see/resolve this in the battle").

Death
Six days after the Lancaster House Agreement was signed Robert Mugabe, on the Voice of Zimbabwe radio station, conveyed "an extremely sad message" to "all the fighting people of Zimbabwe": the forty-one-year-old Tongogara was dead, killed in a car accident in Mozambique on 26 December 1979.

Josiah Tungamirai, the ZANLA High Command's political commissar, relates that on the night of the fatality, he and Tongogara had been travelling with others in two vehicles from Maputo to Chimoio. Tungamirai said he was in the front vehicle. It was dark and the roads were bad. Tungamirai's car passed a military vehicle that had been carelessly abandoned, with no warning signs at the side of the road. After that, he could no longer see the headlights of the following car in his rear view mirror. Eventually he turned back, and, as he had feared, they found Tongogara's car had struck the abandoned vehicle. Tongogara was sitting in the front passenger seat. Tungamirai told me that he had struggled to lift Tongogara out of the wrecked car. He said that as he was doing so, Tongogara heaved a huge sigh and died in his arms.

Margaret Dongo was one of the last people to see him alive. "We were eighteen girls who were having a function and he came to say a few words to bless the occasion."

ZANU released a statement from the undertaker, Mr K.J Stokes (not Mr R Silke) saying his injuries were consistent with a road accident, but no autopsy results or pictures were released.

Theories on death
A CIA intelligence briefing of 28 December 1979 said Tongogara was a potential political rival to Mugabe because of his "ambition, popularity and decisive style". On the same day, the US embassy in Zambia reported, "Almost no one in Lusaka accepts Mugabe's assurance that Tongogara died accidentally. When the ambassador told the Soviet ambassador the news, the surprised Soviet immediately charged 'inside job'".

Ian Smith also insisted in his memoirs that Tongogara's "own people" killed him and that he had disclosed at Lancaster House that Tongogara was under threat. Smith wrote, "I made a point of discussing his death with our police commissioner and head of special branch, and both assured me that Tongogara had been assassinated".

A former Detective in the Law and Order Section of the former British South Africa Police saw photographs of Tongogara's body. There were three wounds, consistent with gunshot wounds, to his upper torso. The undertaker's statement was not a "formal" autopsy report and so was dismissed by all but the senior politburo of ZANU.

In spite of all the rumours, Mr. R. Silke, the pathologist for Mashfords Funeral Home in Zimbabwe, insisted in a 1982 television documentary, "Tongo", that the theory of gunshot wounds on Tongogara's body was false, as he had personally inspected the body and that the injuries that he found were consistent with road accident trauma.

Legacy
In 1990, to commemorate the tenth anniversary of Zimbabwe's independence, streets were renamed in Tongogara's honour, including North Avenue in Harare, which became Josiah Tongogara Avenue, and Wilson Street in Bulawayo, which became Josiah Tongogara Street.

In 2005, Tongogara was honoured on a stamp of Zimbabwe.

In 2012 it was revealed that Tongogara's wife was not receiving war veteran's widow benefits.

On 6 December 2017, the King George VI Barracks, which houses the Zimbabwe National Army (ZNA) and Air Force of Zimbabwe (AFZ) headquarters, was officially renamed Josiah Magama Tongogara Barracks.

References

External links
The Josiah Tongogara Legacy Foundation

1938 births
1979 deaths
Zimbabwe African National Liberation Army personnel
Zimbabwean politicians
Zimbabwean military leaders
Road incident deaths in Mozambique